Magnetic gun may refer to:

 Coilgun, a type of projectile accelerator consisting of one or more coils used as electromagnets in the configuration of a linear motor that accelerate a ferromagnetic or conducting projectile to high velocity
 Railgun, a device that uses electromagnetic force to launch high velocity projectiles, by means of a sliding armature that is accelerated along a pair of conductive rails

See also

 Magnetic weapon, one that uses magnetic fields to accelerate or stop projectiles, or to focus charged particle beams